Shimizunosawa Dam  is a gravity dam located in Hokkaido Prefecture in Japan. The dam is used for water supply. The catchment area of the dam is 4.9 km2. The dam impounds about 12  ha of land when full and can store 860 thousand cubic meters of water. The construction of the dam was started on 1980 and completed in 1984.

References

Dams in Hokkaido